The Synod of Queensland or Queensland Synod is a state council of the Uniting Church in Australia. The word 'synod' also describes the regular meeting (every 18 months) of representatives of the state-wide church. These meetings are known as the Synod in Session. The next Synod in Session will be the 36th Synod in 2022.

The Assembly is the national council of the church, headed by the President of the Uniting Church, with a general secretary as chief executive officer. The six geographically-based synods are responsible for overall support and resourcing of the church in their area—especially in community services, mission planning, theological education and other educational services, administration relating to ministers, and property and financial services. The elected head of each synod is the moderator, and a general secretary is usually appointed as the chief executive officer. The moderator is the spiritual head and the main spokesperson for the Uniting Church in Queensland. The current moderator is The Reverend Andrew Gunton and he was inducted at the 35th Synod on 22 October 2020.

Presbyteries
The Synod of Queensland contains a number of presbyteries within its bounds. A presbytery is a council of the Uniting Church which has oversight of congregations, ministry and programs within a region. Ministers of the Word and deacons are responsible to their presbytery, which has the duty of caring for them and ensuring their work is carried out faithfully. Presbytery meetings include ordained ministers, lay pastors, and elected lay persons from every congregation.

The Synod of Queensland has seven presbyteries.

 Bremer Brisbane Presbytery 
 Carpentaria Presbytery  (formerly Calvary Presbytery and North Queensland Presbytery)
 Central Queensland Presbytery 
 Mary Burnett Presbytery 
 Moreton Rivers Presbytery 
 South Moreton Presbytery 
 The Downs Presbytery

Education
Trinity College Queensland provides theological education for ministers and lay people. Degree courses are accredited by the Australian College of Theology.

Raymont Residential College is a residential college for tertiary students. It is co-located at the Uniting Church Centre in Auchenflower, Brisbane with Trinity College Queensland. Grace College is at the St Lucia campus of the University of Queensland, and caters only for women.

Moderators

References

External links 
 
 
Uniting Church in Australia
Christianity in Queensland